"Sick" is the first single from Adelitas Way's second studio album, Home School Valedictorian, released on March 11, 2011. It is the band's third single in overall. This the band's first single to hit the Billboard Alternative Songs chart, reaching No. 29 and staying on the chart for 14 weeks. The song reached No. 2 on the US Mainstream Rock chart.

Music video
The music video for "Sick", which was directed by Michael Maxxis, premiered on May 12, 2011. The video was filmed in the Griffith Park Tunnel in Los Angeles, California.

Track listing

Charts

Year-end charts

References

External links
 http://www.thegauntlet.com/article/1225/21690/Adelitas-Way-Vocalist-Comments-On-Catching-Fire-At-Video-Shoot
 https://www.youtube.com/watch?v=UaVcRnPt3EM

2011 singles
Adelitas Way songs
2010 songs
Songs written by Rick DeJesus
Songs written by Marti Frederiksen
Virgin Records singles

Alternative metal songs